Liliac may refer to 

Liliac (Band) an American heavy metal band  
Liliac, a village in the commune of Bahna, Romania